Dimethylamine is an organic compound with the formula (CH3)2NH.  This secondary amine is a colorless, flammable gas with an ammonia-like odor.  Dimethylamine is commonly encountered commercially as a solution in water at concentrations up to around 40%.  An estimated 270,000 tons were produced in 2005.

Structure and synthesis
The molecule consists of a nitrogen atom with two methyl substituents and one hydrogen. Dimethylamine is a weak base and the pKa of the ammonium CH3--CH3 is 10.73, a value above methylamine (10.64) and trimethylamine (9.79).

Dimethylamine reacts with acids to form salts, such as dimethylamine hydrochloride, an odorless white solid with a melting point of 171.5 °C. Dimethylamine is produced by catalytic reaction of methanol and ammonia at elevated temperatures and high pressure:
2 CH3OH  +  NH3   →  (CH3)2NH  +  2 H2O

Natural occurrence
Dimethylamine is found quite widely distributed in animals and plants, and is present in many foods at the level of a few mg/kg.

Uses
Dimethylamine is a precursor to several industrially significant compounds. It reacts with carbon disulfide to give dimethyl dithiocarbamate, a precursor to zinc bis(dimethyldithiocarbamate) and other chemicals  used in the sulfur vulcanization of rubber.  The solvents dimethylformamide and dimethylacetamide are derived from dimethylamine. It is raw material for the production of many  agrichemicals and pharmaceuticals, such as dimefox and diphenhydramine, respectively.  The chemical weapon tabun is derived from dimethylamine.  The surfactant lauryl dimethylamine oxide is found in soaps and cleaning compounds.  Unsymmetrical dimethylhydrazine, a rocket fuel, is prepared from dimethylamine.
(CH3)2NH + NH2Cl → (CH3)2NNH2 ⋅ HCl
It is an attractant for boll weevils.

Reactions
It is basic, in both the Lewis and Brønsted senses. It easily forms dimethylammonium salts upon treatment with acids. Deprotonation of dimethylamine can be effected with organolithium compounds.  The resulting LiNMe2, which adopts a cluster-like structure, serves as a source of "Me2N−".  This lithium amide has been used to prepare volatile metal complexes such as tetrakis(dimethylamido)titanium and pentakis(dimethylamido)tantalum.

It is also a Lewis base.

It reacts with many carbonyl compounds. Aldehydes give aminals.  For example reaction of dimethylamine and formaldehyde gives bis(dimethylamino)methane:
 2 (CH3)2NH  +  CH2O →   [(CH3)2N]2CH2  +  H2O
It converts esters to dimethylamides.

Dimethylamine undergoes nitrosation to give dimethylnitrosamine, a carcinogen.

Safety
Dimethylamine is not very toxic with the following LD50 values: 736 mg/kg (mouse, i.p.); 316 mg/kg (mouse, p.o.); 698 mg/kg (rat, p.o.); 3900 mg/kg (rat, dermal); 240 mg/kg (guinea pig or rabbit, p.o.).

See also
Methylamine
Trimethylamine

References

External links
  (gas)
  (aqueous solution)
 
 Properties from Air Liquide
 MSDS at airliquide.com

Alkylamines
Insect pheromones
Insect ecology
Secondary amines